is a Japanese immunologist known for research on IgM and cytokines, most famously, interleukin 6.

He did postdoctoral work under Kimishige Ishizaka, the discoverer of IgE at Johns Hopkins University.

He is listed by the Institute for Scientific Information (ISI) as a highly cited biologist and he is also in the top ten of h-index of living biologists.

Life
Tadamitsu Kishimoto, who was born in Osaka in 1939, was President of Osaka University from 1997 to 2003 and a Member, Council for Science and Technology Policy, Cabinet office from 2004 to 2006. He is now Professor, Graduate School of Frontier Biosciences, Osaka University.  He was Dean, Professor and Chairman of Department of Medicine at Osaka University Medical School from which he graduated in 1964. He is currently Japan's leading scientist in the field of life science, specifically in immunology and has made fundamental contributions to the understanding of cytokine functions through series of his studies on IL-6, its receptor system, and transcription factors. He has developed anti-IL6 receptor therapy for several immune disorders including Castleman's disease, rheumatoid arthritis and juvenile idiopathic arthritis.

He has received numerous awards, including the Imperial Prize of the Japan Academy in 1992, the Sandoz Prize for Immunology from the International Union of Immunological Society in 1992 and the Avery-Landsteiner Prize from the German Immunology Society in 1996. In 1998, he was awarded the Order of Culture from Emperor. He was awarded Robert Koch Gold Medal in 2003, Honorary Life Time Achievement Awards from International Cytokine Society in 2006 and the Crafoord Award from the Royal Swedish Academy of Sciences in 2009. He has been elected a Foreign Associate of the US National Academy of Sciences in 1991, a member of the Japan Academy in 1995 and a member of German Academy of Sciences Leopoldina in 2005. He served as a president of the International Immunopharmacology Society, International Cytokine Society and the Japanese Immunology Society.  He is an honorary member in American Association of Immunologists and American Society of Hematology. In 2020, He received the prestigious Tang Prize in Biopharmaceutical Science.

IL-6
In the early 1970s, Kishimoto discovered the activity inducing antibody production in culture supernatants of T cells.  Furthermore, he demonstrated that the activity for inducing IgG and IgE antibodies could be separated.  Later, this finding led to the discovery of the dichotomy of helper T cells, Th1 and Th2.  
On the basis of these early studies, Kishimoto discovered and cloned interleukin-6 and its receptor and delineated the signaling pathway used by IL-6 and the set of related cytokines that utilize gp-130, which he also discovered.  He identified the transcription factors NF-IL-6 and STAT3, both central to the action of IL-6.  He further discovered a family of suppressors of cytokine signaling, the SOCS molecules, that are key regulators of cytokine function.  
He demonstrated the involvement of IL-6 in the pathogenesis of cardiac myxomas, multiple myeloma, Castleman’s disease, rheumatoid arthritis, Crohn's disease and juvenile idiopathic arthritis (JIA).  He identified IL-6 as a hepatocyte stimulating factor which induces acute phase reactions.  
He prepared a monoclonal anti-IL-6 receptor antibody that was subsequently humanized and has been shown to be of great therapeutic value in a series of autoinflammatory diseases including Castleman's Disease, rheumatoid arthritis and juvenile idiopathic arthritis.   
His work has dominated the field of proinflammatory cytokines and has established paradigms for the study of all of cytokine biology, ranging from discovery of the cytokine and its receptor, through signaling and transcriptional mechanisms, to the utilization of such knowledge to develop highly effective therapeutics.
A series of his IL-6 studies for 35 years since 1973 have been highly appreciated; He was ranked as the world’s 8th-most-cited researchers between 1983 and 2002 and he is in the top ten of h-index of living biologists.

Recognition

Awards

Behring-Kitasato Prize from Hoechst Japan, 1982
Osaka Science Prize, 1983
Erwin von Bälz Prize, 1986
Takeda Prize, 1988
Asahi Prize, 1988
Prize of The Japanese Medical Association, 1990
Scientific Achievement Award from the International Association of Allergology and Clinical Immunology, 1991
Imperial Prize of the Japan Academy, 1992
Sandoz Prize for Immunology from International Union of Immunology Society, 1992
The Avery-Landsteiner Prize from the German Immunology Society, 1996	
The Donald Seldin Award from the International Society of Nephrology, 1999
ISI Citation Laureate Award, 2000
Robert Koch Prize - Robert Koch Gold Medal, 2003
Honorary Lifetime Achievement Awards, International Cytokine Society, 2006
7th International Award of the Japan Rheumatism Foundation, 2008
The Crafoord Prize from the Royal Swedish Academy of Sciences, 2009
Japan Prize, 2011
King Faisal International Prize, 2017
Tang Prize in Biopharmaceutical Science, 2020
Clarivate Citation Laureates, 2021

Honors

Person of Cultural Merit, Japan 1990
Foreign Associate, The US National Academy of Sciences, 1991
Honorary Member, the American Association of Immunologists, 1992
Honorary Citizen, Tondabayashi City, 1992
Member, the Japan Academy, 1995
Foreign Associate member, the Institute of Medicine of the National Academy of Science, USA, 1997
Honorary member, the American Society of Hematology, 1997
The Order of Culture of Japan, 1998
Doctor Honoris Causa, Universidad Technologica de Santiago, UTESA, 2001
Honorary Member, International Association of Dental Research, 2001
Honorary Professor, the Fourth Military Medical University, Xi’an, China, 2002
Honorary Member, World Innovation Foundation, 2002
Doctor of Science, Honoris Causa, Mahidol University, 2003
Clemens von Pirquet Distinguished Professor, Medicine and Immunology, University California, Davis, 2004
Member, German Academy of Sciences Leopoldina, 2005

References

Japanese immunologists
1939 births
Living people
People from Tondabayashi, Osaka
Foreign associates of the National Academy of Sciences
Recipients of the Order of Culture
Osaka University alumni
Academic staff of Osaka University
Laureates of the Imperial Prize
Members of the German Academy of Sciences Leopoldina
Members of the National Academy of Medicine